Alidus is a genus of beetle in the family Cerambycidae. It is the only species in the genus Alidus biplagiatus. It was described by Gahan in 1893.

References

Pteropliini
Beetles described in 1893